Delaware George may refer to:

 Keekyuscung, Lenape warrior and chief, killed at the Battle of Bushy Run, 1763
 Nenatcheehunt, Lenape chief, died 1762